In mathematics, the term path space refers to any topological space of paths from one specified set into another. In particular, it may refer to:

 The classical Wiener space of continuous paths
 The Skorokhod space of càdlàg paths
 For the usage in algebraic topology, see path space (algebraic topology). For Moore's path space, see path space fibration#Moore's path space.

See also: loop space, the space of loops in a topological space